Sir William Thomas Taylor,  (10 November 1848 – 18 March 1931)  was a British colonial administrator.

Career
He began his career in colonial service as Collector of Customs and Excise in Larnaca (Cyprus) in 1879, subsequently being promoted to Receiver-General and Chief Collector of Customs and Excise of Cyprus.

He was appointed the 21st Accountant General and Controller of Revenue of Ceylon on 10 June 1895, succeeding James Alexander Swettenham, and held the office until 1 March 1902. He was succeeded by F. R. Ellis.

In July 1901, he was appointed as the 8th Colonial Secretary of Singapore, taking up his position there until 1904.

He was confirmed in the appointment of Resident-General for the Federated Malay States in January, 1905 and made KCMG that year in recognition of his services. He held the post until 1911.

Honours
Taylor was awarded Companion of St. Michael and St. George (CMG) in 1895 New Year Honours and Knight Commander of St. Michael and St. George (KCMG) in 1905 Birthday Honours.

Family
Taylor married Mabel Ruth Mason on 14 July 1914, the widow of Mr J Scott Mason of F.M.S. Civil Service.

References

1848 births
1931 deaths
British colonial governors and administrators in Asia
British colonial governors and administrators in Europe
Auditors General of Sri Lanka
Knights Commander of the Order of St Michael and St George
Chief Secretaries of Singapore
Administrators in British Singapore